Monsignor Farrell High School is an American Catholic high school for boys, located in the Oakwood section of Staten Island, New York.

Opened in 1961, the school is named in honor of Monsignor Joseph Farrell, a Catholic priest, as well as a religious, political and community leader on Staten Island.

Notable alumni

 Bill Britton (born 1955, class of 1974) – former PGA Tour player
 David Carr (born 1987, class of 2005) – member, New York City Council
 Christopher Celenza (born 1967, class of 1985) – James B. Knapp Dean, Zanvyl Krieger School of Arts and Sciences, Johns Hopkins University; former dean, Georgetown College at Georgetown University
 Kevin Coyle (born 1956) – former defensive coordinator, Miami Dolphins
 Michael Cusick (born 1969) –  New York State Assemblyman
 Dan Donovan (born 1956) – former U.S. Congressman from New York;  former District Attorney of Richmond County
 Vito Fossella (born 1965) – former U.S. Congressman from New York;  Staten Island Borough President 
 Joe Gambardella (born 1993, class of 2011) – professional ice hockey player, Utica Comets of the American Hockey League (as a prospect for the New Jersey Devils of the National Hockey League)
 John Gallucci Jr. (class of 1985) – founder and president, JAG Physical Therapy; CEO, JAG-ONE Physical Therapy; medical coordinator, Major League Soccer; author
 Joseph Gatto (born 1976, class of 1994) – cast member, Impractical Jokers
 Andrew Lanza (born 1964, class of 1982) – lawyer; Republican politician; member, New York State Senate, representing the 24th District which encompasses most of Staten Island
 Pete Lembo (born 1970, class of 1988) – associate head coach and special teams coordinator, University of South Carolina
 Michael McMahon (born 1957) – former U.S. Congressman;  District Attorney of Richmond County
 James Murray (born 1976, class of 1994) – cast member, Impractical Jokers
 Kevin O'Connor – former general manager,  Utah Jazz
 James Oddo (born 1966) – former Staten Island Borough President; former New York City Councilman
 Brian Quinn (born 1976, class of 1994) –  cast member, Impractical Jokers
 Theo Rossi (born 1975, class of 1993) – actor
 Ryan Rossiter (born 1989) – professional basketball player
 Michael Tannousis – New York State Assemblyman
 Louis R. Tobacco (born 1972, class of 1990) –  president, Monsignor Farrell High School; former New York State Assemblyman
 William J. Taverner – sex educator; editor, American Journal of Sexuality Education
 Sal Vulcano (born 1976, class of 1994) – cast member, Impractical Jokers
 Edmund Whalen (born 1958, class of 1976) – auxiliary bishop, Roman Catholic Archdiocese of New York; former principal, Monsignor Farrell High School
 John Wolyniec (born 1977, class of 1995) – former Major League Soccer player

References

External links

 , the school's official website

Boys' schools in New York City
Congregation of Christian Brothers secondary schools
Educational institutions established in 1961
1961 establishments in New York City
Roman Catholic high schools in Staten Island